"Dear Life" is a song recorded by Canadian country music duo High Valley for their fifth studio album of the same name (2016). Group member Brad Rempel co-wrote the song with Seth Mosley and Ben Stennis, while Mosley co-produced the track with Mike "X" O'Connor. The song was first released digitally as the second promotional single on October 28, 2016, and was later released to Canadian country radio July 17, 2017 as the album's third Canadian single and fifth overall single.

Composition
"Dear Life" is a Bluegrass-inspired song that features a "percussive" chorus and acoustic verses. The song's lyrics address making choices as one grows up and was inspired by the duo's kids. Drums feature prominently in the song's instrumentation, and "Dear Life"'s production has been compared to Avicii's "Hey Brother", which combines elements of country music with electronic dance music.

Chart performance
"Dear Life" peaked at number five on the Canada Country chart, earning the group their ninth consecutive top-10 single.

Certification

Release history

References

2016 songs
2017 singles
High Valley songs
Warner Music Group singles
Songs written by Brad Rempel
Songs written by Seth Mosley
Songs written by Ben Stennis
Country ballads